"Summertime" is an aria composed in 1934 by George Gershwin for the 1935 opera Porgy and Bess. The lyrics are by DuBose Heyward, the author of the novel Porgy on which the opera was based, and Ira Gershwin. 

The song soon became a popular and much-recorded jazz standard, described as "without doubt ... one of the finest songs the composer ever wrote ... Gershwin's highly evocative writing brilliantly mixes elements of jazz and the song styles of blacks in the southeast United States from the early twentieth century". Composer and lyricist Stephen Sondheim characterized Heyward's lyrics for "Summertime" and "My Man's Gone Now" as "the best lyrics in the musical theater".

Porgy and Bess
Gershwin began composing the song in December 1933, attempting to create his own spiritual in the style of the African American folk music of the period. Gershwin had completed setting DuBose Heyward's poem to music by February 1934, and spent the next 20 months completing and orchestrating the score of the opera.

The song is sung several times throughout Porgy and Bess. Its lyrics are the first words heard in act 1 of the opera, following the communal "wa-do-wa". It is sung by Clara as a lullaby. The song theme is reprised soon after as counterpoint to the craps game scene, in act 2 in a reprise by Clara, and in act 3 by Bess, singing to Clara's now-orphaned baby after both parents died in the storm.

The song was recorded for the first time by Abbie Mitchell on July 19, 1935, with George Gershwin playing the piano and conducting the orchestra (on: George Gershwin Conducts Excerpts from Porgy & Bess, Mark 56 667).

The 1959 movie version of the musical featured Loulie Jean Norman singing the song. That rendition finished at #52 in AFI's 100 Years...100 Songs survey of top tunes in American cinema.

Analysis

Lyrics
Heyward's inspiration for the lyrics was the southern folk spiritual-lullaby "All My Trials", of which he had Clara sing a snippet in his play Porgy. The lyrics have been highly praised by Stephen Sondheim. Writing of the opening line, he says

Music
Musicologist K. J. McElrath wrote of the song:
Gershwin was remarkably successful in his intent to have this sound like a folk song. This is reinforced by his extensive use (one exception: the note B under the word "high") of the pentatonic scale (C–D–E–G–A) in the context of the A minor tonality and a slow-moving harmonic progression that suggests a "blues". Because of these factors, this tune has been a favorite of jazz performers for decades and can be done in a variety of tempos and styles.

While in his own description, Gershwin did not use any previously composed spirituals in his opera, Summertime is often considered an adaptation of the African American spiritual "Sometimes I Feel Like a Motherless Child", which ended the play version of Porgy.

Other versions

Statistics for the number of recordings of "Summertime" vary by source; while older data is restricted to commercial releases, newer sources may include versions self-published online. The Jazz Discography in 2005 listed 1,161 official releases, ranking the song fourth among jazz standards. Joe Nocera in 2012 said there were "over 25,000" recordings. Guinness World Records lists the website's 2017 figure of 67,591 as the world record total.

Other versions to make the pop charts include those by:
In September 1936, a recording by Billie Holiday was the first to hit the US pop charts, reaching number 12.
Sam Cooke (US number 81, 1957)
Al Martino (UK number 49, 1960)
The Marcels (US number 78, 1961)
Ricky Nelson (US number 89, 1962)
The Chris Columbo Quintet (US number 93, 1963).
The most commercially successful version was by Billy Stewart, whose scat-laden R&B version reached number 10 on the Billboard Hot 100 and number 7 on the R&B chart in 1966; his version also reached number 39 in the UK and number 13 in Canada.
In the UK, a version by the Fun Boy Three reached No. 18 on the UK Singles Chart in 1982.
 The version by Louis Armstrong and Ella Fitzgerald, released on their 1959 album Porgy and Bess, was certified silver by the British Phonographic Industry (BPI) in 2022.

See also
 List of 1930s jazz standards

References

Sources

External links
 "A Languid Look Back To Gershwin's 'Summertime'", NPR Music, October 23, 2008

1935 songs
1936 singles
1966 singles
1982 singles
Billie Holiday songs
Billy Stewart songs
Fun Boy Three songs
Songs from Porgy and Bess
Lullabies
Songs about childhood
Songs with lyrics by DuBose Heyward
1930s jazz standards
Pop standards
Jazz compositions in A minor
Songs with music by George Gershwin
Opera excerpts
Soprano arias